Admiral Lucas may refer to:

Charles Davis Lucas (1834–1914), British Royal Navy rear admiral
Engelbertus Lucas Jr. (1785–1870), Batavian Navy lieutenant admiral 
Engelbertus Lucas Sr. (c. 1747–1797), Batavian Navy rear admiral 
Robert S. Lucas (1930–2016), U.S. Coast Guard rear admiral